Anytime Fitness is a franchise of 24-hour health and fitness clubs that is headquartered in Woodbury, Minnesota, United States.  The company operates over 5,000 franchised locations in 50 countries. The gym facilities are open 24 hours a day, 365 days of the year. Anytime Fitness was the fastest growing health club franchise in 2014. In 2015, Entrepreneur Magazine ranked Anytime Fitness first on its global franchise list. Anytime Fitness is a subsidiary of Self Esteem Brands, LLC.

History

2002–2004: Background and founding

Chuck Runyon, Dave Mortensen, and Jeff Klinger first met in the early 1990s while working for a fitness club in St. Paul, Minnesota. In 1995, they jointly purchased and ran Southview Athletic Club for seven years. During their ownership of the club, its membership rose from 500 to 4000. They sold the gym in 2001. During their ownership of Southview Athletic Club, they worked for a consulting firm focused on improving under-performing athletic clubs across the United States. They developed the idea for Anytime Fitness after surveying the expectations that long-term members of large gyms had for their fitness clubs.
 
Runyon, Mortensen, and Klinger founded Anytime Fitness in 2002. Eric Keller, a former employee of Southview Athletic Club was interested in their business concept and agreed to become the first franchise owner of Anytime Fitness. They provided Keller with support in choosing a site location, marketing strategies, equipment selection, and membership sales.

The first franchise location opened in Cambridge, Minnesota later that year. They chose the site because of the lack of other fitness clubs in the immediate area and a population large enough to support a fitness club. Shortly after, two more locations were opened by former Southview Athletic Club employees in Duluth and Albert Lea, Minnesota. Runyon, Mortensen and Klinger sold 29 franchises before they opened their own corporate-owned location in Bemidji, Minnesota.

2005-2010: Growth and international expansion
In February 2005, Anytime Fitness opened its first club outside of the United States in Halifax, Nova Scotia, Canada. By 2008, the company had almost 700 franchisees in 45 U.S. states and Canada. They also had 12 locations that they owned themselves. In January 2009, they opened their 1000th club in Wake Village, Texas.

By October 2009, the company had more than 1,200 clubs with around 800,000 members. In December 2009, Jeff Klinger, who had been the company's CEO since inception, sold his shares in Anytime Fitness and stepped down from his role as CEO. Chuck Runyon took over the role as CEO upon his departure.

In mid-2010, the company announced plans to open clubs in Japan, Belgium, the Netherlands, Luxembourg, the United Kingdom, and Ireland. At that point, it had already expanded into Mexico and India.

2011-2014: Further expansion

In 2011, Anytime Fitness expanded into Qatar, Poland and the Netherlands. By 2012, the franchise had opened locations in Australia, Canada, Grand Cayman, Japan, Mexico, the Netherlands, Poland, New Zealand, Qatar, and the United Kingdom.

In November 2012, Anytime Fitness bought Waxing The City, a small chain of waxing and hair removal salons. Runyon and Mortensen converted Waxing The City into a franchise model similar to Anytime Fitness.

In October 2013, the company hired celebrity tattoo artist and Anytime Fitness member, Jimmy Hayden, to tattoo its purple running man logo on nearly 200 franchisees, corporate employees, club managers, and personal trainers at an annual conference. Members and employees have a history of getting the logo tattoo, with an estimated 4,000 individuals inking their bodies, including CEO Chuck Runyon. Anytime Fitness provides a tattoo artist at its monthly training events and covers all expenses. The company will also reimburse anyone who submits a photo of their tattoo of the logo and describe why they wanted the tattoo.

In December 2013, Anytime Fitness purchased a 38-acre site in Woodbury, Minnesota to build new company headquarters. Roark Capital Group acquired a large minority share in Anytime Fitness in March 2014. Erik Morris and Steve Romaniello, two directors from Roark, joined the board at Anytime Fitness after the acquisition. Mortensen and Runyon remained the company's primary holders and continued to run the business.

2015 to present

On October 12, 2015, Anytime Fitness opened its 3,000th club in Stroud, Gloucestershire, England.

The company moved its headquarters from Hastings to Woodbury, Minnesota in April 2016. The new location contains 80,000 square feet of office space with a tattoo parlor and running trail.

In June 2017, Anytime Fitness became the first U.S.-based fitness chain to be granted a franchising license in China. The company entered into a master franchise agreement with Maurice Levine, who had previously opened franchise locations in Singapore, Malaysia, and the Philippines.

In 2019 the Anytime Fitness franchise started to provide passengers on the cruise ship, Magellan Explorer, with a gym to exercise travelling to and from Antarctica.

Operations
As of 2018, Anytime Fitness had over 4,200 gym locations and 3 million clients in more than 32 countries. Each location is open 24 hours a day, 365 days out of the year. Members have secure access to all facilities (including during unstaffed hours) with a computerized key fob. There are gym locations in all 50 US states, Canada, Mexico, Australia, New Zealand, United Kingdom, Ireland, Grand Cayman, Poland, the Netherlands, Spain, Qatar, South Korea, India, Italy, Chile, Japan, Singapore, Malaysia, Hong Kong and the Philippines. In 2016, the company had 188 employees, but its new Woodbury office can hold up to 300. Each club has a security system in place that contains cameras, recorded card swipes, and the ability to notify a security company if a patron is injured or feels unsafe. ProVision Security, an Anytime Fitness-owned company, provides security.

Awards
In 2010, the International Health, Racquet, and Sportsclub Association named Anytime Fitness the fastest growing fitness club. Franchise Chatter titled Anytime Fitness as the franchise with the best business model in 2011. The Star Tribune called Anytime Fitness one of Minnesota's top workplaces in 2011, 2012, and 2013. The company ranked first in Minnesota Business Magazine's best company to work for in 2012 and 2013. Forbes ranked the company 14th as America's most promising companies. In 2014, Entrepreneur Magazine ranked Anytime Fitness number one on their franchise 500 list. In 2015 and 2016, Anytime Fitness was ranked first on the publication's top global franchises list. In 2020 Anytime Fitness was ranked twenty-second on the publication's franchise 500 list.

References

American companies established in 2002
Health care companies established in 2002
Franchises
Health clubs in the United States
2002 establishments in Minnesota
Medical and health organizations based in Minnesota
Washington County, Minnesota